Liberty is the fifth studio album by Canadian musician Lindi Ortega. It was released on March 30, 2018 under Shadowbox Records.

Critical reception
Liberty was met with "generally favorable" reviews from critics. At Metacritic, which assigns a weighted average rating out of 100 to reviews from mainstream publications, this release received an average score of 77, based on 7 reviews. Aggregator Album of the Year gave the release a 79 out of 100 based on a critical consensus of 6 reviews.

Track listing

Personnel

Musician
 Lindi Ortega – primary artist
 Savannah Conley – backing vocals
 Charlie McCoy – harmonica
 Jeremy Fetzer – guitar
 Jon Radford – drums
 Mike Rinne – bass
 Leif Shires – trumpet

Production
 Jeremy Ferguson – engineer
 Graham Waks – engineer
 Skylar Wilson – producer
 Jordan Lehning – mixing
 Sangwook Nam – mastering

Charts

References

2018 albums
Lindi Ortega albums